The 1954 Idaho gubernatorial election was held on November 2. Republican nominee Robert E. Smylie defeated Democratic nominee Clark Hamilton with 54.24% of the vote.

The incumbent governor was not allowed to run for a second four-year term until 1958.

Primary elections
Primary elections were held on August 10, 1954.

Democratic primary

Candidates
Clark Hamilton, Weiser state senator
Charles Gossett, Nampa, former governor and senator
Cantril Nielsen, Pocatello, former county commissioner
Joseph McNew, Boise

Republican primary

Candidates
Robert E. Smylie, attorney general
John Sanborn, Hagerman, former congressman
Larry Gardner, Coeur d'Alene mayor

General election

Candidates
Robert E. Smylie, Republican 
Clark Hamilton, Democratic

Results

References

1954
Idaho
Gubernatorial